Norland/Trotter Aerodrome  is located  west of Norland, Ontario, Canada.

References

Registered aerodromes in Ontario
Buildings and structures in Kawartha Lakes